Kin'ichi or Kinichi (written: 欽壹 or 欽一) is a masculine Japanese given name. Notable people with the name include:

, Japanese sumo wrestler
, Japanese comedian
, Japanese actor

Japanese masculine given names